Hans Schuster (7 December 1888 – 10 June 1970) was a Swedish long-distance runner. He competed in the marathon at the 1920 Summer Olympics.

References

External links
 

1888 births
1970 deaths
Athletes (track and field) at the 1920 Summer Olympics
Swedish male long-distance runners
Swedish male marathon runners
Olympic athletes of Sweden
People from Östersund
Sportspeople from Jämtland County